Patricia Forde (born ) was former Director of the Galway Arts Festival and an Irish children's author.

Forde was raised in Market Street, Galway, a fluent Irish speaker. She became a member of An Taibhdhearc at age ten, both acting and directing its plays over the following ten years. She spent ten years as a primary school teacher, and was one of the early members of Macnas. Macnas co-founder, Pádraic Breathnach, encouraged her work on stories for Macnas's street performances. While working with Macnas she took a year's leave from teaching to write her first book, Tír faoi Thoinn. However, an opportunity to become Director of the Galway Arts Festival (proposed by Ollie Jennings in 1990) meant that she never returned to teaching.

She left in 1995, subsequently working in Ros na Rún, Aifric and RTÉ soap Fair City.

Forde's other work has included a creative programme for children at the festival, which developed into the Baboró International Arts Festival for Children.

She is married with two children and lives in Moycullen.

Bibliography

 Tír faoi Thoinn/Land Under the Sea, 1990
 The King’s Secret, O’Brien Press, 1992
 Frogs Do Not Like Dragons, Egmont, March 2010
Hedgehogs Do Not Like Heights, Egmont, 2011
Ceitidh Ceare, 2011
Binji: Madra Ar Strae, 2011
The Wordsmith / The List, Little Island Books, 2014
Witches Do Not Like Bicycles, Egmont, 2015 
Bumpfizzle The Best on Planet Earth, Little Island Books, June 2018

External links
 http://www.galwayindependent.com/profiles/profiles/patricia-forde-%11-author/
 http://www.obrien.ie/author.cfm?authorID=80
 https://web.archive.org/web/20101127115936/http://galwaynews.ie/12205-author-patricias-got-write-stuff
 http://en.wordpress.com/tag/patricia-forde/

References
 Macnas: Joyful Abandonment, Terry Dineen, The Liffy Press, November 2007. 1905785283

People from County Galway
Irish children's writers
Irish schoolteachers
Living people
20th-century Irish women writers
21st-century Irish women writers
Irish women children's writers
1960 births